Ko Yal Toe Yal Soe Soe Yal is a 1967 Burmese black-and-white drama film, directed by Tin Maung starring Nyunt Win and Khin Than Nu. Tin Maung won the Best Director Award and Khin Than Nu won the Best Actress Award in 1967 Myanmar Motion Picture Academy Awards for this film.

Cast
Nyunt Win as Myat Swe
Khin Than Nu as Toe Toe

References

1967 films
1960s Burmese-language films
Burmese black-and-white films
Films shot in Myanmar
1967 drama films
Burmese drama films